The Groundhouse River is a  tributary of the Snake River in eastern Minnesota. Via the Snake River and St. Croix River, it is part of the Mississippi River watershed flowing to the Gulf of Mexico.

See also
List of rivers of Minnesota
List of longest streams of Minnesota

External links 
Minnesota Watersheds
USGS Hydrologic Unit Map - State of Minnesota (1974)

References

Rivers of Kanabec County, Minnesota
Rivers of Mille Lacs County, Minnesota
Rivers of Minnesota
Tributaries of the Mississippi River